This page is a list of present-day bridges over the River Seine and its channels, sorted by département, and then sorted from downstream to upstream.  After each bridge is listed the name of the communes which it links together, with the one on the right bank of the river given first.  The list does not include bridges over its tributaries.
Beside the bridge crossings, eight ferry crossings, all located in the département de Seine Maritime are still in use as of 2020. From downstream up the first two are considered seagoing vessels (in reference to their gross tonnage) at Duclair and Quillebeuf sur Seine and the remaining six (Dieppedalle, Val de la Haye, La Bouille, le Mesnil sous Jumièges, Jumièges and Yainville) being smaller are considered river crafts and comply to respective regulations and crew requirements . Before 2009 the ferries operated by the département de Seine Maritime were free for the local cars (bearing the 76 registration) and a toll was charged for other french and foreign vehicles. Nowadays all Seine ferries are toll free and carry a total of 10 million passengers annually. It is not unusual for them to cross the wake of quite sizeable ocean going ships as Rouen is considered a seaport with a busy ship traffic.

All locations are in France.

Crossings

 Pont Guillaume-le-Conquérant (1970),
 Pont Jeanne-d'Arc (1956, also bearing Rouen's pré-métro line since 1994), Rouen
 Pont Boïeldieu (1955), Rouen
 Pont Pierre-Corneille (1952), Rouen
 Pont Mathilde (1979), Rouen
 Viaduc d'Eauplet (railway bridge, rebuilt in 1946), Rouen
 Ponts ferroviaires, Tourville-la-Rivière – Oissel, two successive bridges over the two channels of the Seine separated by Île Mayeux.
 Ponts d'Oissel (D 13), Tourville-la-Rivière – Oissel, two successive bridges over the two channels of the Seine separated by Île Mayeux.
 Viaduc d'Oissel (autoroute A13), Tourville-la-Rivière – Oissel, bridge over the two channels of the Seine separated by Île Sainte-Catherine.
 Viaduc d'Orival (railway bridge), Saint-Aubin-lès-Elbeuf – Orival
 Pont Guynemer (suspension bridge, 1953, D7), Elbeuf
 Pont Jean-Jaurès (D 840, 1964), Saint-Aubin-lès-Elbeuf – Elbeuf

Seine-Maritime / Eure (upstream)
 Viaduc de Criquebeuf (autoroute A 13), Sotteville-sous-le-Val – Criquebeuf-sur-Seine, simultaneously crossing the rivers Seine and Eure, whose parallel courses are at this point separated by a narrow bank of earth only about 250m wide.

Eure

 Pont de Pont-de-l'Arche (01954, N15), Igoville – Pont-de-l'Arche (closely followed by a second bridge over the Eure)
 Pont du Manoir (SNCF railway bridge), Le Manoir
 Passerelle de l'écluse d'Amfreville, Amfreville-sous-les-Monts – Poses
 Ponts de Saint-Pierre-du-Vauvray (1975, identical reconstruction of the previous bridge), Andé – Saint-Pierre-du-Vauvray, two successive bridges over the two channels of the Seine separated by Île du Bac.
 Passerelle Muids-Bernières, Muids – Bernières-sur-Seine
 Pont suspendu des Andelys (1947), Les Andelys – Tosny
 Pont de Courcelles-sur-Seine (D 316), Courcelles-sur-Seine – Aubevoye
 Passerelle du barrage-écluse de Port-Mort, Port-Mort – Gaillon
 Vieux pont de Vernon (Old Bridge of Vernon, 12th century, in ruins, one arch survives on the right bank), Vernon
 Pont Clémenceau, Vernon

Yvelines
 Pont de Bonnières, Bennecourt – Bonnières-sur-Seine
 Bridge between Île aux Dames and Île l'Aumône, Mantes-la-Jolie
 Pont de Mantes (D 983a, 1945), Limay – Mantes-la-Jolie (resting on Île-aux-Dames)
 Vieux pont de Limay (Old Bridge of Limay, lacking several of its arches), between Limay (right bank) and Île aux Dames
 Viaduc routier (Rocade est - D 983), Limay – Mantes-la-Ville (resting on the Île-aux-Dames)
 Pont ferroviaire (SNCF), Limay – Mantes-la-Ville
 Pont de Rangiport (D 130), links Gargenville to Épône resting on Île de Rangiport
 Pont de l'île de Vaux (pont privé), between Vaux-sur-Seine (right bank) and Île de Vaux
 Pont Rhin et Danube (D 14, 1957), links Meulan to the Mureaux resting on Île Belle
 Pont aux Perches (old 12th-century bridge), between Meulan on the right bank and Île du Fort
 Pont Côme, links Île Belle to Île du Fort, to Meulan
 Pont suspendu de Triel (suspension bridge), Triel-sur-Seine
 Viaduc routier (rocade D1, 2003), Triel-sur-Seine – Vernouillet
 Pont de l'île de Villennes, between Villennes-sur-Seine (left bank) and the Île de Villennes
 Pont de l'île de Migneaux, between Poissy (rive gauche) and the Île de Migneaux
 Passerelle de l'île de Migneaux, between Poissy (rive gauche) and the Île de Migneaux

 Ancien pont de Poissy (Old Bridge of Poissy, partially destroyed in 1944), some arches survive beside Poissy between the left bank and the upstream extremity of Île de Migneaux
 Pont de Poissy (D 190), Carrières-sous-Poissy – Poissy
 Pont Eiffel (railway bridge, rebuilt in 1947), Conflans-Sainte-Honorine
 Pont de Conflans (N 184, 1950), Conflans-Sainte-Honorine
 Passerelle Saint-Nicolas, Conflans-Sainte-Honorine
 Pont de Maisons-Laffitte (D 308), Sartrouville – Maisons-Laffitte
 Passerelle, on the small channel, between Maisons-Laffitte (left bank) and the Île de la Commune
 Railway bridge (SNCF), Sartrouville – Maisons-Laffitte (resting on Île de la Commune)
 Pont, on the small channel, between Maisons-Laffitte (left bank) and the Île de la Commune
 Pont, on the small channel, between Le Mesnil-le-Roi (left bank) and the Île de la Borde
 Viaduc autoroutier, A14, Montesson – Le Mesnil-le-Roi
 Viaduc ferroviaire (RATP, RER A), Le Pecq (resting on Île Corbière)
 Pont du Pecq (D 186), Le Pecq
 Pont de l'île de la Loge, between Bougival (left bank) and the Île de la Loge
 Passerelle, between Bougival (rive gauche) and the Île de la Loge
 Pont du Maréchal-De-Latte-de-Tassigny (D 321), Croissy-sur-Seine – Bougival (resting on the Île de la Chaussée)

Yvelines / Hauts-de-Seine
 Railway bridge (RATP, RER A), Chatou – Rueil-Malmaison, rests on Île des Impressionnistes
 Pont de Chatou (D 186), Chatou – Rueil-Malmaison, rests on Île des Impressionnistes
 Viaduc de carrières-sur-Seine (1996, autoroute A14), Carrières-sur-Seine – Nanterre, rests on Île des Fleurie
 Railway bridge (RER A), Carrières-sur-Seine – Nanterre, rests on Île des Fleurie

Val-d'Oise / Hauts-de-Seine
 Railway bridge (SNCF), Bezons – Nanterre, rests on Île Saint-Martin
 Pont de Bezons (D 392), Bezons – Colombes
 Pont-aqueduc de Colombes (D 15e), Argenteuil – Colombes
 Pont d'Argenteuil, Argenteuil – Gennevilliers
 Railway bridge, Argenteuil – Gennevilliers

 Viaduc de Gennevilliers (Autoroute A15, 1976, width doubled in 1991), Argenteuil – Gennevilliers

Seine-Saint-Denis / Hauts-de-Seine
 Pont ferroviaire, in two parts Épinay-sur-Seine – L'Île-Saint-Denis – Gennevilliers
 Pont d'Épinay (D 911), in two parts Épinay-sur-Seine – L'Île-Saint-Denis – Gennevilliers
 Pont de l'île Saint-Denis (D 986), in two parts Saint-Denis – L'Île-Saint-Denis – Villeneuve-la-Garenne
 Viaduc autoroutier (A 86), Saint-Ouen – L'Île-Saint-Denis – Villeneuve-la-Garenne
 Pont de Saint-Ouen-les-Docks, Saint-Ouen – L'Île-Saint-Denis – Gennevilliers
 Pont ferroviaire de Saint-Ouen (SNCF), Saint-Ouen

Hauts-de-Seine (downstream)
 Pont de Gennevilliers (D 17), Clichy – Asnières-sur-Seine
 Pont de Clichy (D 19), Clichy – Asnières-sur-Seine
 Pont ferroviaire (RATP, 1980), Clichy – Asnières-sur-Seine (Paris Métro Line 13)
 Pont d'Asnières (D 909), Clichy – Asnières-sur-Seine
 Pont ferroviaire d'Asnières (SNCF), Clichy – Asnières-sur-Seine (the line which ends at gare Saint-Lazare)
 Pont de Levallois (D 9bis), Levallois-Perret – Courbevoie
 Passerelle piétonnière (1990), between Levallois-Perret and Île de la Jatte (downstream point)
 Pont de Courbevoie (D 908), Neuilly-sur-Seine – Courbevoie (resting on Île de la Jatte)
 Passerelle piétonnière, between Neuilly-sur-Seine and Île de la Jatte (upstream point)
 Pont de Neuilly (1942, N 13), Neuilly-sur-Seine – Puteaux (also carries the 1992 extension of Paris Métro Line 1 towards La Défense, resting on Île du Pont, resting on the upstream point of Île de Puteaux)
 Pont de Puteaux (reconstruit, 1980), Neuilly-sur-Seine – Puteaux (resting on Île de Puteaux)

Paris / Hauts-de-Seine
The following bridges are partly in the Bois de Boulogne, which is in the 16th arrondissement of the département and commune of Paris, although not in the city (ville) of Paris.
 Pont de Suresnes, Paris – Suresnes
 Passerelle de l'aqueduc de l'Avre,  Paris – Saint-Cloud
 Viaduc autoroutier de Saint-Cloud (Autoroute A13), Paris – Saint-Cloud

Hauts-de-Seine (upstream)
 Pont de Saint-Cloud, Boulogne-Billancourt – Saint-Cloud
 Pont de Sèvres, Boulogne-Billancourt – Sèvres
 Ponts (Boulevard des Îles), Boulogne-Billancourt – Issy-les-Moulineaux
 Pont d'Issy, Boulogne-Billancourt – Issy-les-Moulineaux (resting on the upstream point of Île Saint-Germain)

Paris

The city of Paris has 37 bridges across the Seine, of which 3 are pedestrian only and 2 are rail bridges.  Three link Île Saint-Louis to the rest of Paris, 8 do the same for Île de la Cité and one links the 2 islands to each other. From downstream  to upstream:

 Pont Aval ("downstream  bridge" carrying the Boulevard Périphérique) 
 Pont du Garigliano
 Pont Mirabeau
 Pont de Grenelle (crossing the Île aux Cygnes)
 Pont Rouelle (rail viaduct for line C of the RER crossing the Île aux Cygnes)
 Pont de Bir-Hakeim (crossing the Île aux Cygnes, comprising one stage with a railway bridge carrying Line 6 of the Paris Métro and another for road traffic)
 Pont d'Iéna
 Passerelle Debilly (pedestrian)
 Pont de l'Alma
 Pont des Invalides
 Pont Alexandre III
 Pont de la Concorde
 Passerelle Léopold-Sédar-Senghor (1999) (pedestrian, formerly the Passerelle de Solférino, renamed in 2006)
 Pont Royal
 Pont du Carrousel
 Passerelle des Arts (pedestrian)
 Pont Neuf (crossing the west corner of the Île de la Cité, Paris's oldest bridge, built between 1578 and 1607)
 Pont au Change (between the Rive Droite and the Île de la Cité)
 Pont Saint-Michel (between the Île de la Cité and the Rive Gauche)
 Pont Notre-Dame (between the Rive Droite and the Île de la Cité)
 Petit Pont (between Île de la Cité and the Rive Gauche)
 Pont d'Arcole (between the Rive Droite and the Île de la Cité)
 Pont au Double (between Île de la Cité and the Rive Gauche)
 Pont de l'Archevêché (between Île de la Cité and the Rive Gauche)
 Pont Saint-Louis (pedestrianized, between Île de la Cité and the Île Saint-Louis)
 Pont Louis-Philippe (between the Rive Droite and the Île Saint-Louis)
 Pont Marie (between the Rive Droite and the Île Saint-Louis)
 Pont de la Tournelle (between the Île Saint-Louis and the Rive Gauche)
 Pont de Sully (crosses the eastern corner of Île Saint-Louis)
 Pont d'Austerlitz
 Viaduc d'Austerlitz (railway bridge used for  Line 5 of the métro), directly followed on the Rive Droite by the viaduc du quai de la Rapée,
 Pont Charles-de-Gaulle (1996)
 Pont de Bercy (made up of a railway bridge carrying the Line 6 of the Paris Métro and another stage for road traffic);
 Passerelle Simone-de-Beauvoir (pedestrian), inaugurated 13 July 2006
 Pont de Tolbiac
 Pont National
 Pont amont ("upstream bridge" carrying the Boulevard Périphérique)

Val-de-Marne
 Pont Nelson Mandela downstream (D 50b), Charenton-le-Pont – Ivry-sur-Seine
 Pont Nelson Mandela upstream (D 50), Charenton-le-Pont – Ivry-sur-Seine
 Passerelle Charenton - Ivry (pedestrian bridge and support for electric cables), Charenton-le-Pont – Ivry-sur-Seine
 Pont d'Ivry (N 19, 1957),  Alfortville – Ivry-sur-Seine
 Passerelle de l'écluse du Port à l'Anglais (footbridge over the lock of Port à l'Anglais), Alfortville – Ivry-sur-Seine
 Pont du Port à l'Anglais (D 48, suspension bridge, 1927), Alfortville – Vitry-sur-Seine
 Passerelle GDF de Vitry, Alfortville – Vitry-sur-Seine
 Viaduc de l'A 86, Choisy-le-Roi – Thiais
 Pont de Choisy (N 186, 1965), Choisy-le-Roi
 Pont ferroviaire (Grande Ceinture line), Choisy-le-Roi
 Pont de Villeneuve-le-Roi (D 32, 1950), Villeneuve-Saint-Georges – Villeneuve-le-Roi
 Passerelle de l'écluse d'Ablon, Vigneux-sur-Seine – Ablon-sur-Seine
 Pont d'Athis-Mons (SNCF railway bridge), Vigneux-sur-Seine – Athis-Mons
 Pont de la Première-Armée-Française (D 931), Draveil – Juvisy-sur-Orge
 Pont de Champrosay, Champrosay – Ris-Orangis

Essonne
 Pont d'Évry (double apron, D 96), Étiolles – Évry
 Pont autoroutier (A 104), Corbeil-Essonnes
 Viaduc N 104, Saint-Germain-lès-Corbeil – Corbeil-Essonnes
 Pont de l'Armée-Patton (N 446), Corbeil-Essonnes

Seine-et-Marne
 Pont de Sainte-Assise (D 50), Seine-Port – Saint-Fargeau-Ponthierry
 Pont du Mée (SNCF railway bridge), Le Mée-sur-Seine – Dammarie-lès-Lys
 Pont de la pénétrante (N 6), Melun
 Pont Jeanne-d'Arc, Melun
 Pont Jean-de-Lattre-de-Tassigny, Melun
 Pont du Général-Leclerc, Melun
 Pont Notre-Dame, Melun
 Pont du Pet au Diable (SNCF railway bridge), Vaux-le-Pénil – La Rochette
 Pont de Chartrettes (D 115), Chartrettes – Bois-le-Roi
 Pont de Fontaine-le-Port (D 116), Fontaine-le-Port
 Pont de Valvins (D 210), Vulaines-sur-Seine – Samois-sur-Seine
 Pont-aqueduc de Champagne (D 301), Champagne-sur-Seine – Thomery
 Pont de Champagne (road-bridge) (D 301), Champagne-sur-Seine – Thomery
 Pont de Saint-Mammès (D 40), Champagne-sur-Seine – Saint-Mammès
 Pont de Varennes (SNCF railway bridge), La Grande-Paroisse – Varennes-sur-Seine -
 Pont de Seine (N 105), Montereau-Fault-Yonne
 Pont Saint-Martin (junction D 403/D 441), Montereau-Fault-Yonne
 Railway viaduct (LGV Paris-Sud-Est), Montereau-Fault-Yonne
 Motorway viaduct (autoroute A5), Montereau-Fault-Yonne
 Railway bridge, Saint-Germain-Laval
 Pont (D 29), Marolles-sur-Seine
 Pont de La Tombe (D 29), La Tombe
 Pont (D 77), Balloy
 Pont de Bray-sur-Seine, Mouy-sur-Seine – Bray-sur-Seine
 Pont de Noyen (D 78), Noyen-sur-Seine
 Pont (D 49a), Villiers-sur-Seine

Aube
 Pont (D 168), Courceroy
 Pont (D 619), Nogent-sur-Seine
 Pont (D 919), Nogent-sur-Seine, in two parts, resting on Île des Écluses
 Pont de Bernières (pont ferroviaire SNCF), Nogent-sur-Seine
 Pont (D 68), Marnay-sur-Seine
 Pont (D 52), Pont-sur-Seine
 Pont (D 440), Romilly-sur-Seine
 Pont (D 116), Maizières-la-Grande-Paroisse
 Pont (D 178), Saint-Oulph
 Pont (D 373), Méry-sur-Seine
 Pont (D 619), Troyes (rocade)
 Pont (D 1), Clérey
 Pont (D 28), Saint-Parres-lès-Vaudes – Villemoyenne
 Pont de Chappes
 Pont (D 81), Fouchères limit of the 1st/2nd Halieutique category
 Pont (D 32), Virey-sous-Bar – Courtenot
 Pont (D 93), Bourguignons
 Pont de Bar-sur-Seine ancient building.
 Pont (N 71), Merrey-sur-Arce

Marne
 Pont (D 48), Conflans-sur-Seine
 Pont (D 50), Marcilly-sur-Seine
 Pont, Marcilly-sur-Seine, confluence of the Aube and the canal de la Haute Seine, limit of the navigable Seine

Côte-d'Or
 Pont (N 71), Châtillon-sur-Seine
 Pont (D 29), Aisey-sur-Seine
 Pont (N 71), Aisey-sur-Seine

See also
 Seine
 List of bridges in Paris
 List of locks on the Seine

References

External links
 Presentation on the bridges of Hauts-de-Seine
 Pont Gustave Flaubert, Lift Bridge, Rouen